"Treat Me Like the Dog I Am" is a song by American heavy metal band Mötley Crüe released as the third and final single of their 2000 studio album New Tattoo which charted at #41 on the Billboard 200 and #3 on the Top Internet Albums chart. This is the last single to feature Randy Castillo on drums before his death in 2002.

Track listing
 Treat Me Like the Dog I Am

Personnel
 Vince Neil - Lead vocals, Rhythm Guitar
 Nikki Sixx - Bass Guitar, Backing Vocals, Keyboards
 Randy Castillo - Drums
 Mick Mars - Lead Guitar, Backing Vocals

References

2000 songs
Mötley Crüe songs